Euxton is a civil parish in the Borough of Chorley, Lancashire, England.  The parish contains 28 buildings that are recorded in the National Heritage List for England as designated listed buildings. Of these, two are listed at Grade II*, the middle grade, and the others are at Grade II, the lowest grade.  The parish contains the village of Euxton, and is surrounded by agricultural land.  Many of the listed buildings are, or originated as, farmhouses and farm buildings.  The other listed buildings include churches and associated structures, large houses, some with associated structures, and a pair of former weavers' cottages,

Key

Buildings

References

Citations

Sources

Lists of listed buildings in Lancashire
Buildings and structures in the Borough of Chorley